The  is a public transportation authority of Kumamoto City, Japan.

Tram Routes
The bureau operates 2 tram lines within the city.

Tram Fare
The fare is a flat 170 yen for adults, 90 yen for children, payable by cash or public transit card (including Nimoca, ICOCA, Suica, and Pasmo).

Operators
Bus lines in the city were formerly operated by the agency, but have since been privatized.

The city government has operated tram lines since 1924, and bus lines since 1927, but the current transportation bureau was formed in 1944.

Kumamoto City Tram
Currently,  has five lines in official count, but with only two routes regularly in service.

Lines and routes

Lines:
Trunk Line (幹線): Kumamoto-Ekimae — Suidōchō
Suizenji Line (水前寺線): Suidōchō — Suizenji-Kōen
Kengun Line (健軍線): Suizenji-Kōen — Kengunmachi
Kami-Kumamoto Line (上熊本線): Karashimachō — Kami-Kumamoto
Tasaki Line (田崎線): Kumamoto-Ekimae — Tasakibashi
Routes:
Route A (A系統): Tasakibashi — Kumamoto-Ekimae — Karashimachō — Suidōchō — Suizenji-Kōen — Kengunmachi
Route B (B系統): Kami-Kumamoto — Karashimachō — Suidōchō — Suizenji-Kōen — Kengunmachi

Gallery

See also
List of light-rail transit systems

External links 

  Official website—English version of official map
  Kumamoto Shiden Database, unofficial fansite.
  Kumamoto-city Transportation Museum, unofficial fansite.
 Network map

References

1921 establishments in Japan
Bus companies of Japan
Tram transport in Japan
Kumamoto
Intermodal transport authorities in Japan